The list of ship commissionings in 1971 includes a chronological list of all ships commissioned in 1971.


See also 

1971
 Ship commissionings